Carlos Octavio Cuque López (born 24 November 1945) is a former long-distance runner from Guatemala. He competed in the marathon and 5000 m at the 1968 and 1972 Summer Olympics and finished around the 40th position in the marathon in both Games.

He won the marathon event at the 1973 Central American Games setting a new Games record at 2h23:52. He finished fifth in the marathon at the 1971 Pan American Games.

Personal bests:  
5000 m – 14:40.5 (1971)
Marathon – 2h19:20 (1980)

References

1945 births
Living people
Athletes (track and field) at the 1968 Summer Olympics
Athletes (track and field) at the 1972 Summer Olympics
Guatemalan male long-distance runners
Olympic athletes of Guatemala
Athletes (track and field) at the 1971 Pan American Games
Athletes (track and field) at the 1975 Pan American Games
Pan American Games competitors for Guatemala
Guatemalan male marathon runners
Central American Games gold medalists for Guatemala
Central American Games medalists in athletics